The 2018 Piala Belia is the eighth season of the Piala Belia since its establishment in 2008. The league is currently the youth level (U19) football league in Malaysia. Kedah U19 are the defending champions.

Teams
The following teams are participating in the 2018 Piala Belia. 

 Felda United U19
 Johor Darul Ta'zim IV
 Kedah U19
 Kelantan U19
 Kuala Lumpur U19
 Melaka U19
 Negeri Sembilan U19
 Pahang U19
 Perak U19
 Perlis U19
 PKNP U19
 PKNS U19
 Pulau Pinang U19
 Sabah U19
 Sarawak U19
 Selangor U19
 SSBJ U16
 SSTMI U17
 Terengganu IV
 UiTM U19

League table

Group A

Group B

Result table

Group A

Group B

Knock-out stage

Bracket

Quarterfinals
|-

Melaka U19 won 3–2 on aggregate.

Terengganu IV won 8–1 on aggregate.

Kedah U19 won 4–4 on aggregate.

PKNS U19 won 1–0 on aggregate.

Semifinals
|-

Terengganu IV won 4–3 on aggregate.

PKNS won 2–0 on aggregate.

Final

Champions

See also

 2018 Malaysia Super League
 2018 Malaysia Premier League
 2018 Malaysia FAM Cup
 2018 Malaysia FA Cup
 2018 Piala Presiden

References

External links
 Football Association of Malaysia
 SPMB 

2018 in Malaysian football
Piala Belia